Chen Xiaoxu (October 29, 1965 – May 13, 2007), monastic name Miao Zhen was a Chinese actress, famous for her role as Lin Daiyu in 1987 TV series Dream of the Red Chamber. On February 23, 2007, she became a bhikkhuni (Buddhist nun) in Baiguoxinglong Temple, Changchun. She died of breast cancer on May 13, 2007.

Biography
Chen Xiaoxu was born in Anshan, Liaoning in 1965. She became famous for her role as Lin Daiyu in Dream of the Red Chamber, a CCTV series in 1987.

However, Chen did not stay in the entertainment industry for long. She decided to begin a career in advertising. For a time, she was the General Manager for Shi Bang Advertisement Co. Ltd. and Shi Bang Culture Development Co. Ltd.

In 2007, less than two months before her death, Chen became a Buddhist nun, ordained by Master Chin Kung, and was given the  Dharma name Miaozhen.

Chen died of breast cancer in Shenzhen on May 13, 2007.

Achievements
1984-1987—was cast in the China Central Television series, Dream of Red Mansions, and played the role of Lin Daiyu
1988—was cast in the Shanghai TV series, The Family, Spring and Autumn (an adaptation of Ba Jin's fictional trilogy), and played the role of Cousin Mei.
1998 She became the general manager and director of Beijing Cultural Development Co, Ltd
2004 She was named one of "China's "30 outstanding women in advertising" in the competition of China's Advertising Billboard"

Personal life
Before the shooting of Dream of Red Mansions'' was completed, Chen married her boyfriend, whom she had known since childhood, and was her colleague in Anshan Modern Drama troupe. But the marriage did not last and ended in divorce.

Chen's second husband was Hao Tong, a student of Beijing Film Academy. Described as handsome and tall, he made her acquaintance due to graduate work. They both eventually turned to Buddhism.

Notes

1965 births
2007 deaths
Deaths from cancer in the People's Republic of China
Chinese Buddhist nuns
Deaths from breast cancer
People from Anshan
Actresses from Liaoning
People's Republic of China Buddhists
People's Republic of China poets
Poets from Liaoning
Businesspeople from Liaoning
Chinese film actresses
Chinese television actresses
20th-century poets
21st-century Buddhist nuns